The women's team time trial of the 1990 UCI Road World Championships cycling event took place on 29 August 1990 in Utsunomiya, Japan. The course was 49 km long and went from Utsunomiya to Nikkō and back to Utsunomiya.

Final classification

Source

References

1990 UCI Road World Championships
UCI Road World Championships – Women's team time trial
UCI